Jeremy Musson (born London, 1965) is an English author, editor and presenter, specialising in British country houses and architecture.

Career
Musson was an architectural writer on Country Life magazine from 1995 to 1998, and its Architectural Editor from 1998 to 2007. He also presented the BBC Two series The Curious House Guest (2005–6).

Books
The English Manor House
100 Period Details: Plasterwork
2005: How to Read a Country House. London: Ebury Press, 
2008: The Country Houses of John Vanbrugh: from the archives of Country Life.  Aurum Press, .
2009: Up and Down Stairs. London: John Murray 
2012: In Pursuit of the Best Gun: Westley Richards & Co. 1812-2012: a bicentennial history. Birmingham: Westley Richards & Co.  
2018: The Country House: past, present, future; David Cannadine & Jeremy Musson  New York: Rizzoli International

External links 
 

1965 births
Living people
English architectural historians
English male non-fiction writers
Country Life (magazine) people
New Classical architecture